Kuwaiti Persian, known in Kuwait as ʿīmi (sometimes spelled Eimi) is a combination of different varieties of the Persian language and Achomi language (a Persian dialect) that has been spoken in Kuwait for more than 300 years. Persian was spoken since the foundation of Kuwait, especially in the Sharq district of the historical Kuwait City, where families that emigrated from Persia had settled.

Kuwaitis of Iranian ancestry are called Ajam. After conducting research about the usage of Persian language in Kuwait in 2004, Abdulmuhsen Dashti, a professor at Kuwait University, projects that the Persian language will disappear in Kuwaiti Ajam families within two generations due to the anti-preservation attitude of the Kuwaiti government. The government of Kuwait tries to delegitimise the use of the language in as many domains as possible.

History 

Iranians have been migrating to Kuwait for many centuries. Historically, Persian ports provided most of Kuwait's economic needs. Marafi Behbahani was one of the first merchants to settle in Kuwait in the 18th century. The vast majority of Shia Kuwaiti citizens are of Iranian ancestry. However, many Kuwaitis of Iranian origin are Sunni Muslims - such as the Al-Kandari and Awadhi families of Larestani ancestry. Some Kuwaitis of Iranian Balochi origin are Sunni. Balochi families first immigrated to Kuwait in the 19th century. Although historically the term Ajam included both Sunni and Shia in Kuwait, nowadays in modern-day Kuwait, the term Ajam almost exclusively refers to Shia only; which is partly due to political sensitivities following the 1979 Iranian Revolution.

Most Ajam (both Sunni and Shia) resided in the Sharq historical district in the old Kuwait City, thereby forming a linguistic enclave which preserved the language for generations. They communicated in Persian between each other, and did not frequently mingle with Arabic speakers who resided in other districts. The discovery of petroleum oil in 1937 resulted in the industrialization of the formerly residential areas, which scattered people who lived there into the suburbs. The linguistic enclave was not present any longer therefore the Ajam had to learn Kuwaiti Arabic to survive in the new environment.

The Persian emigrants spoke a variety of dialects and sub-dialects. This mixture came to be called ʿīmi ([language] of the Ajam in both Arabic and Persian), over generations, the variety of Persian spoken today by Ajam developed. As all Ajam acquired Kuwaiti Arabic by time, Kuwaiti Persian is expected to be gone within no more than two generations. Older Ajam people who still speak Persian are bilingual in both Kuwaiti Arabic and Persian, while most younger Ajam nowadays are native speakers of Kuwaiti Arabic only.

The majority of Kuwaitis from Failaka Island are of Iranian ancestry. They originally migrated to Failaka from the Iranian coast, mainly Kharg Island and Bandar Lengeh. These people are commonly known as the Huwala in the GCC states. They are predominantly Sunni Muslims and speak Arabic fluently, although prior to the discovery of oil they also spoke Persian fluently. The most important Huwala settlement in Failaka Island pertained to 40 families who migrated from the Iranian island Kharg to Failaka in the years 1841-1842. The most recent settlement occurred in the early 1930s after the imposition of the unveiling law by Reza Shah. A minority of Failaka Island's Kuwaiti families are Shia Persians, they were noted as having their own hussainiyas and the older generations were frequent Arabic speakers, unlike the Kuwaiti Shia of Persian origin in mainland Kuwait City at the time.

Linguistics 
ʿīmi has no official status and it is not standardised. As a koiné language, ʿīmi is often seen as a "childish" patois by the public.

Below is a table the compares some words in Kuwaiti and Standard Persian, as collected by Batoul Hasan. Some changes seen in Kuwaiti Persian are also common in other non-standard Persian dialects in Iran as well.

Discrimination 

The anti-preservation attitude of the Kuwaiti government towards the Persian language will eventually lead to the disappearance of the language in the Kuwaiti society, as Abdulmuhsen Dashti projects. The government of Kuwait tries to delegitimise the use of the language in as many domains as possible.

The Persian language has been considered a significant threat to the dominant Sunni Arab society. In 2012, MP Muhammad Hassan al-Kandari called for a "firm legal action" against an advertisement for teaching the Persian language in Kuwait. The Kuwaiti TV series Karimo received criticism for showing Kuwaiti actors speaking fluent Persian; with some racist voices claiming it was a dictated enforcement of "Iranian culture" on the Kuwaiti society.

The generation of young Kuwaiti Ajam born between 1983 and 1993 are reported to have a minimal proficiency in the language unlike the older generations of Kuwaiti Ajam. Many Ajam parents reported unwillingness to pass the language to young generations for pragmatic reasons, as it will hurdle integration into the xenophobic dominant culture. Kuwait is one of the most xenophobic countries in the world. The Ajam feel pressure to abandon ties that could be interpreted as showing belonging to other countries, in this case Iran, as Persian is synonymous with Iranian for a lot of Kuwaitis, and the Persian language is actually called Iranian in Kuwaiti Arabic. In several interviews conducted by PhD student Batoul Hasan, Ajam youth have shown hesitation to use or learn Persian due to stigmatisation and prejudice. One person said: "We live in an Arab country where Arabic is the main language and Eimi has no place in this society.", "Speaking Eimi is a sensitive issue that could erupt. It would be more acceptable to speak Israeli (Hebrew) in public, but when you speak Farsi due to societies prejudices you are asking for problems". Many thought that Persian has no place and no use in the Kuwaiti society, as Arabic is the language of Kuwait (according to them). Multilingualism was not favourable, in the eyes of people interviewed by Batoul, unless it involved the acquisition of Arabic and English. Some people even believed that the acquisition of Kuwaiti Persian as a first or second language may affect the acquisition of Arabic.

Education
Persian is taught in several institutes across Kuwait, including academic institutes, such as Kuwait University, diplomatic cultural institutes, such as the Iranian Embassy cultural office, language institutes, such as Berlitz, and religious institutes, such as Al-Imam Al-Mujtaba seminaries.

In the educated elite circle, Persian is seen as a language with high cultural value. According to an Iranian cultural advisor to Kuwait, Khameyar said that a lot of Kuwaitis speak Persian proudly. He also added that many state officials carry conversations in Persian; including non-Ajam Kuwaitis who speak and answer in Persian with embassy officials. Khameyar also expressed his surprise from the reception their Persian language courses had received.

Further reading
The Persian Dialects of the Ajam in Kuwait
Dénes Gazsi - The University of Iowa - The Persian Dialects of the ʿAjam in Kuwait
The Persian Dialects of the Ajam in Kuwait

Ideology, identity, and linguistic capital: a sociolinguistic investigation of language shift among the Ajam of Kuwait. Batoul Hasan. 2009. The University of Essex.

See also 
 'Ajam of Kuwait: Kuwaitis of Iranian ancestry. 
 Kuwaiti Arabic: The variety of Arabic spoken by almost all Kuwaitis (including Ajam). It had a lot of influence on Kuwaiti Persian (and vice versa).
 Tarakma: Also called Lamerd, from where many Ajam have emigrated.

Notes

References

Languages of Kuwait
Persian dialects and varieties
Endangered Indo-European languages
Society of Kuwait
History of Kuwait
Kuwait